Hipparchia maderensis, the Madeiran grayling, is a species of butterfly in the family Nymphalidae. It is endemic to Madeira. Its natural habitat is temperate forests. Seitz treats it as a race of Hipparchia semele - in maderensis Baker, from Madeira the upperside in both sexes is strongly obscured and in the male almost without any markings.

Sources 

Hipparchia (butterfly)
Endemic fauna of Madeira
Butterflies of Europe
Butterflies described in 1891
Butterflies of Africa
Taxonomy articles created by Polbot